Margaret Traherne (23 November 1919 — 30 June 2006) was an Essex-born artist active in the twentieth century. She was regarded as a leading artist of her generation. Noted for her stained glass designs, she also worked in sculpture as well as embroidered textiles and mixed media, examples of which are held in the Victoria and Albert Museum.

Early life 
Born in Westcliff-on-Sea, Essex, Traherne moved with her family to Long Island, New York in 1925, aged six. She later attended Southend High School after returning from eight years spent in New York.

Education 
Traherne attended Croydon School of Art from 1936, where she studied under Ruskin Spear. It was here that she met her future husband, David Thomas, and the pair married in 1943. Traherne joined the Kingston School of Art during the Second World War, before joining the Design School at the Royal College of Art in 1945. In 1953-54 she spent a year of experimentation at the Central School of Arts and Crafts in the stained glass department  run John Baker and Tom Fairs.

Stained glass windows 
Margaret Traherne's designs for stained glass appear across England, including the examples below,

Fire Window, Manchester Cathedral (1966). The window was reconstructed using glass from Germany after it was destroyed by an IRA bomb in 1996.
Chapel of Reconciliation and The Lady Chapel, Liverpool Cathedral
Bapistry windows, St Peter's Church, Nottingham (1976)
 Chapel of Unity, Coventry Cathedral
 North chancel window, St Peter's Church, Chailey, East Sussex (1978)
 St Cuthberts, Rye Park. Traherne wrote of this design, "I found St. Cuthbert a sympathetic character and one that people today will relate to. I hope that my feeling will come through the design."
Michelham Priory of Upper Dicker, Hailsham in Sussex features Traherne's earliest known glass design, a depiction of the Virgin and Child (1956).
St Kenelm window, St Peter's, Wootton Wawen (1958)
St Margaret Mary Church, Park Gate, Hampshire (1966)

Works in public collections 
A range of works by Margaret Traherne are held in public British collections, including the following,

References

External links 
 
 Obituary, The Independent, 18 July 2006
 Obituary, The Guardian, 10 August 2006

1919 births
2006 deaths
20th-century British sculptors
20th-century English women artists
English women sculptors
People from Westcliff-on-Sea